This is a list of diplomatic missions of the United Arab Emirates, excluding honorary consulates.

Africa

 Algiers (Embassy)

Luanda (Embassy)

 N'Djamena (Embassy)

Djibouti (Embassy)

 Cairo (Embassy)

 Addis Ababa (Embassy)

 Accra (Embassy)

Conakry (Embassy)

 Nairobi (Embassy)

 Tripoli (Embassy)

 Nouakchott (Embassy)

 Rabat (Embassy)
 Laayoune (Consulate-General)

Maputo (Embassy)

Abuja (Embassy)
Lagos (Consulate-General)

 Kigali (Embassy)

 Dakar (Embassy)
 
 Victoria (Embassy)

Mogadishu (Embassy)

Pretoria (Embassy)

Khartoum (Embassy)

Dar es Salaam (Embassy)

Tunis (Embassy)

Kampala (Embassy)

 Harare (Embassy)

Americas

 Buenos Aires (Embassy)

 Brasília (Embassy)
São Paulo (Consulate-General)

 Ottawa (Embassy)
 Toronto (Consulate-General)

 Santiago (Embassy)

 Bogotá (Embassy)

 San José (Embassy)

 Havana (Embassy)

 Mexico City (Embassy)

 Panama City (Embassy)

 Lima (Embassy)

 Washington, D.C. (Embassy)
 Boston (Consulate-General)
 Houston (Consulate-General)
 Los Angeles (Consulate-General)
 New York City (Consulate-General)

Asia

 Kabul (Embassy)

 Yerevan (Embassy)

 Baku (Embassy)

 Manama (Embassy)

 Dhaka (Embassy)

Beijing (Embassy)
Guangzhou (Consulate-General)
Hong Kong (Consulate-General)
Shanghai (Consulate-General)

 Tbilisi (Embassy)

 New Delhi (Embassy)
 Mumbai (Consulate-General)
 Trivandrum (Consulate-General)

 Jakarta (Embassy)

 Tehran (Embassy)
 Bandar Abbas (Consulate-General)

 Baghdad (Embassy)

 Tel Aviv (Embassy)

 Tokyo (Embassy)

 Amman (Embassy)

 Astana (Embassy)

 Kuwait City (Embassy)

 Beirut (Embassy)

 Kuala Lumpur (Embassy)

Malé (Embassy)

 Ulaanbaatar (Embassy)

 Kathmandu (Embassy)

 Muscat (Embassy)

 Islamabad (Embassy)
 Karachi (Consulate-General)

 Ramallah (Representative Office)

 Manila (Embassy)

 Riyadh (Embassy)
 Jeddah (Consulate-General)

 Singapore (Embassy)

 Seoul (Embassy)

 Colombo (Embassy)

 Damascus (Embassy)

 Bangkok (Embassy)

 Ankara (Embassy)
 Istanbul (Consulate-General)

 Ashgabat (Embassy)

 Tashkent (Embassy)

 Hanoi (Embassy)

 Sana'a (Embassy)

Europe

 Vienna (Embassy)

 Minsk (Embassy)

 Brussels (Embassy)

 Sofia (Embassy)

 Nicosia (Embassy)

 Prague (Embassy)

 Copenhagen (Embassy)

 Helsinki (Embassy)

 Paris (Embassy)

 Berlin (Embassy)
 Bonn (Embassy branch office)
 Munich (Consulate-General)

 Athens (Embassy)

 Budapest (Embassy)

 Dublin (Embassy)

 Rome (Embassy)

 Riga (Embassy)

 Podgorica (Embassy)

 The Hague (Embassy)

 Oslo (Embassy)

Warsaw (Embassy)

 Lisbon (Embassy)

 Bucharest (Embassy)

 Moscow (Embassy)

 Belgrade (Embassy)

 Madrid (Embassy)
 Barcelona (Consulate-General)

 Stockholm (Embassy)

 Bern (Embassy)

 Kyiv (Embassy)

 London (Embassy)

Oceania

Canberra (Embassy)
Melbourne (Consulate-General)

 Wellington (Embassy)

Multilateral Organizations
 Brussels (Mission to the European Union)
 Cairo (Permanent Mission to the Arab League)
 Geneva (Permanent Missions to the United Nations and other international organizations)
 New York (Permanent Mission to the United Nations)
 Vienna (Permanent Missions to the IAEA and CTBTO)

Gallery

Diplomatic missions to open

 Pristina (Embassy)

Non-resident diplomatic missions

See also
 List of diplomatic missions in the United Arab Emirates
 Foreign relations of the United Arab Emirates

References

Ministry of foreign affairs of the United Arab Emirates
Embassy of the United Arab Emirates in Canberra, Australia
Embassy of the United Arab Emirates in Brasilia, Brazil
Embassy of the United Arab Emirates in Paris, France
Embassy of the United Arab Emirates in Berlin, Germany (Arabic)
Embassy of the United Arab Emirates in New Delhi, India
Embassy of the United Arab Emirates in London, United Kingdom
Embassy of the United Arab Emirates in Washington D.C., United States
Embassy of the United Arab Emirates in Madrid, Spain
Embassy of the United Arab Emirates in Singapore
Permanent Mission of the United Arab Emirates in Geneva, Switzerland

 
Diplomatic missions
United Arab Emirates